Calguia is a genus of snout moths. It was erected by Walker, in 1863, and is known from Japan.

Species
 Calguia defiguralis Walker, 1863
 Calguia deltophora (Lower, 1903)
 Calguia rufobrunnealis Yamanaka, 2006

References

External links
 
 

Phycitini
Pyralidae genera